State Route 174 (SR-174) is a state highway in the U.S. state of Utah. Spanning  in rural Millard County, it connects the Intermountain Power Plant with U.S. Route 6 south of Lynndyl.

Route description
Starting at the main gate of the Intermountain Power Plant in rural Millard County, State Route 174 travels straight in a west-southwest direction for about  along Brush Wellman Road through the Sevier Desert before ending at its intersection with U.S. Route 6.

History
The Utah State Legislature established State Route 174 in 1985, along its current alignment. This coincided with the construction of the Intermountain Power Plant, which commenced in 1981, and began commercial operation in 1986. Before 1969, this was part of the much longer Utah State Route 215.

Major intersections
The entire route is in rural Millard County, Utah.

References

 174
174